The 2023 New Zealand Motocross Championship season is the 49th New Zealand Motocross Championship season. 

The series will have four rounds across the country, running from early February to late March. This will be the first championship since 2021, as the previous year's competition was cancelled due to the COVID-19 pandemic. Hamish Harwood is the reigning champion in the MX1 category, after taking his fifth national title in 2021.

The third round of the championship was originally scheduled to take place at the Hawke's Bay track. Following Cyclone Gabrielle, the round had to be cancelled with the final round at Taupo being converted into a double-header in its place.

Race calendar and results

MX1

MX2

Circuit locations

MX1

Participants

Riders Championship

Points are awarded to finishers of the main races, in the following format: